Hyohondania is a genus of mites in the family Acaridae.

Species
 Hyohondania kanoi Sasa, 1952

References

Acaridae